Iliuță Dăscălescu (born 15 July 1972) is a Romanian wrestler. He competed in the men's Greco-Roman 48 kg at the 1992 Summer Olympics.

References

1972 births
Living people
People from Roman, Romania
Romanian male sport wrestlers
Olympic wrestlers of Romania
Wrestlers at the 1992 Summer Olympics